Lemmer may refer to:
 Lemmer, a town in the municipality of Lemsterland (province of Friesland), in the Netherlands
 Lemmer (surname)
 Lemmer (whaling), a person who dismembers (butchers) a whale
 Moths
 Lemmeria, a genus of the family Noctuidae
 Acronicta lemmeri or the impressive dagger moth
 Catocala lemmeri or the graceful underwing 
 Hypagyrtis lemmeri or the esther moth
 Lithophane lemmeri or Lemmer's noctuid moth
 Zale lemmeri or the gray spring zale